The 2022 ITF Women's World Tennis Tour is the 2022 edition of the second-tier tour for women's professional tennis. It is organised by the International Tennis Federation and is a tier below the WTA Tour. The ITF Women's World Tennis Tour includes tournaments with prize money ranging from $15,000 up to $100,000.

From 1 March, following the Russian invasion of Ukraine the ITF announced that players from Belarus and Russia could still play on the tour but would not be allowed to play under the flag of Belarus or Russia.

Key

Month

January

February

March

References

External links 
 International Tennis Federation (ITF)

 1